The Crystal Mill, or the Old Mill is an 1892 wooden powerhouse located on an outcrop above the Crystal River in Crystal, Colorado, United States.  It is accessible from Marble, Colorado via four-wheel drive.  Although called a Watermill, it is more correctly denoted as a compressor station, which used a water turbine to drive an air compressor, and was originally built with a horizontal wheel. The compressed air was then used to power other machinery or tools.

Names
In the 21st century, the mill is usually called the Crystal Mill or the Old Crystal Mill.  Many decades ago, when the mill was still in use, it was called the Sheep Mountain Power House at the Lost Horse Millsite, or simply the Lost Horse Mill. The building is built on a mining claim named "Lost Horse". Sometimes it is erroneously called the Dead Horse Mill. The site is referred to as a "mill" because there was a 3-stamp mill for crushing ore, in a building directly adjacent to the south of the surviving structure.

History
The mill was constructed in 1893 by George C. Eaton and B.S. Phillips, promoters of the Sheep Mountain Tunnel and Mining Company. It was built as a power plant for the Sheep Mountain Tunnel. Originally it had a horizontal waterwheel that generated compressed air for miners in the nearby silver mines.  It fell into disuse in 1917 when the Sheep Mountain Tunnel mine closed. The mill was placed on the National Register of Historic Places on July 5, 1985.

See also
National Register of Historic Places listings in Gunnison County, Colorado

References

External links

Directory of Colorado State Register Properties

Gallery

Industrial buildings and structures in Colorado
Buildings and structures in Gunnison County, Colorado
Industrial buildings and structures on the National Register of Historic Places in Colorado
Tourist attractions in Gunnison County, Colorado
Watermills in the United States
National Register of Historic Places in Gunnison County, Colorado